Silvia Helena Araujo Pinheiro (born 11 January 1981) is a Brazilian handballer who plays for the Austrian club Hypo Niederösterreich and the Brazilian national team as a left back.

References

1981 births
Living people
Brazilian female handball players
Expatriate handball players
Brazilian expatriate sportspeople in Austria
Brazilian expatriates in Hungary
Handball players at the 2012 Summer Olympics
Olympic handball players of Brazil
Pan American Games gold medalists for Brazil
Pan American Games medalists in handball
Handball players at the 2003 Pan American Games
Handball players at the 2011 Pan American Games
Medalists at the 2011 Pan American Games
21st-century Brazilian women